Sepe may refer to:

Sepe (surname)
Sepé Tiaraju, Brazilian Guaraní tribe leader
Sepe, a form of Kurdish dance
São Sepe River, Brazilian river
São Sepé, Brazilian town